Francisco Javier Martín Medina (born 1 April 1990), commonly known as Goku, is a Spanish footballer who plays for CF Motril as a central midfielder. Besides Spain, he has played in Poland.

Club career
Born in Almuñécar, Granada, Andalusia, Goku finished his graduation in Polideportivo Ejido's youth setup, and made his senior debuts with the reserve team in the 2009–10 season. After a brief stint at Cádiz CF B, being released on 7 April 2010 due to indiscipline reasons, he moved to lowly UD Los Marinos.

In the 2010 summer Goku joined another reserve team, Granada CF B in the lower leagues. He made his first team debut on 4 June of the following year, coming on as a second-half substitute for Abel Gómez in a 0–0 away draw against Recreativo de Huelva in the Segunda División championship.

In August 2011 Goku renewed with the club and was immediately loaned to Segunda División B side Burgos CF. He subsequently joined RSD Alcalá on 1 February 2012 also in a temporary deal, after being deemed surplus to requirements by his previous club.

Goku returned to the Rojiblancos in July 2012, and subsequently extended his contract for a further season. He signed for Real Murcia Imperial in June 2013, but rescinded his link in November and immediately joined AD Almuñécar 77. He spent the rest of his career no higher than the Tercera División, and was part of SD Formentera's side that reached the last 32 of the Copa del Rey in 2016–17.

References

External links

1990 births
Living people
Footballers from Almuñécar
Spanish footballers
Association football midfielders
Segunda División players
Segunda División B players
Tercera División players
Cádiz CF B players
Club Recreativo Granada players
Granada CF footballers
Burgos CF footballers
RSD Alcalá players
SD Formentera players